Simphiwe Hlongwane (born 13 June 1993) is a South African soccer player who plays as a defender for Sekhukhune United. He was released by the club in summer 2020, following their relegation to the National First Division, and subsequently signed for Sekhukhune United.

References

Living people
1993 births
South African soccer players
People from Piet Retief, Mpumalanga
Association football defenders
Polokwane City F.C. players
South African Premier Division players
Sekhukhune United F.C. players